The Scorpion with Two Tails is a 1982 film directed by Sergio Martino.

Plot

Joan has nightmares of Etruscan sacrifices. She knows very well the Etruscan language and her husband Arthur is an archeologist studying Etruscan tombs. In a nightmare she foresees her husband's death. And Arthur is then killed in the same way the Etruscans killed their sacrifice victims, convincing her that someone (or something) may be after her as well.

Cast

Production
The Scorpion with Two Tails originally started life as an 8-part television series to be titled Il mistero degli Etruschi or Lo scorpione a due code. Two original scripts are located in the SIAE archives, one signed by Ernesto Gastaldi and one by Dardano Sacchetti in 1982. The French film producer Jacques Leitienne is also listed in the credits as a co-writer, but this was purely for bureaucratic reasons.

Shooting lasted for four months in Volterra, Cerveteri, Formello, New York City and at R.P.A. Elios Studios in Rome. Although originally made for television, the film was shot on 16mm and blown up to 35mm for its theatrical release.

Release
The Scorpion with Two Tails was distributed theatrically in Italy by Medusa on 17 September 1982. It was distributed in France as Crime au cimetière étrusque on 24 August 1983. In the late 1980s the series was purchased by Reteitalia to be shown as a two-part feature for Canale 5. This abridged version was re-edited by Claudio Lattanzi but was never shown on Canale 5.

Sergio Martino later regretted the film saying "it didn't add anything to my career, not even from an economic standpoint."

See also 
 List of Italian films of 1982

Footnotes

Sources

External links

1982 horror films
Italian thriller films
Films directed by Sergio Martino
Films scored by Fabio Frizzi
Films shot in New York (state)
Films shot in Tuscany
1982 thriller films
1982 films
Films with screenplays by Ernesto Gastaldi
Films produced by Luciano Martino
1980s Italian films